The 2000 Virginia Cavaliers football team represented the University of Virginia during the 2000 NCAA Division I-A football season. The team's head coach was George Welsh, who retired from coaching after the season. They played their home games at Scott Stadium in Charlottesville, Virginia.

Schedule

References

Virginia
Virginia Cavaliers football seasons
Virginia Cavaliers football